Lorenzo Patta (born 23 May 2000) is an Italian sprinter who won a gold medal in 4×100 m relay at the 2020 Summer Olympics in Tokyo, Japan.

On 13 May 2021, running in Savona in 10.13, he established the 7th Italian all-time performance on 100 m and at the same time he reached 41st place in the seasonal world ranking.

Career
He started athletics only during spring 2016, running at school games. In 2017, as a U18, he was second at the national indoors championships on 60 metres, with Valentina Piras as his coach, but continuing playing football. Then the same year, he won the 200 m outdoors. From 2018, he only competes in athletics with a new coach, Francesco Garau, as U20 (junior). He won the Italian titles outdoors (100 and 200 m) with a remarkable 10.37 (+2.3 m/s) for his first competition as a junior. He represented Italy at the 2018 World U20 Championships, at 200 m and at 4x100 m relay, where he did not finish the relay after qualifying Italian team for the final. The following year, he was also the last relay, winning the silver medal at the 2019 European U20 Championships in Borås. In 2020, he ran 10.31 in Grosseto, personal best, for winning U23 national title. In 2021, after a new personal best of 10.13 set in Savona, he replaced Marcell Jacobs on 100 m in Chorzów and finished second of the European Team Championships at his first selection in the senior Italian team.

National records
 4×100 m relay: 37.50 ( Tokyo, 6 August 2021), he ran first leg in the team with Marcell Jacobs, Fausto Desalu, Filippo Tortu.

Achievements

See also
 List of Italian records in athletics
 Italian all-time lists - 100 m
 Italian all-time lists - 4×100 m relay
 Italian national track relay team

References

External links
 

2000 births
Living people
Italian male sprinters
Sportspeople from Sardinia
Athletics competitors of Fiamme Gialle
Athletes (track and field) at the 2020 Summer Olympics
Medalists at the 2020 Summer Olympics
Olympic gold medalists for Italy
Olympic gold medalists in athletics (track and field)
Olympic athletes of Italy